The 2020–21 season was Al-Hazem's 64th year in their existence and their first back season in the MS League. Al-Hazem were relegated to the second tier of Saudi football after finishing 15th in the 2019–20 Saudi Pro League. The club participated in the MS League only following the Saudi FF's decision to reduce the number of teams in the King Cup.

The season covered the period 22 September 2020 to 30 June 2021.

Players

Squad information

Out on loan

Transfers and loans

Transfers in

Loans in

Transfers out

Loans out

Pre-season

Competitions

MS League

League table

Results summary

Results by round

Matches
All times are local, AST (UTC+3).

Statistics

Appearances

Last updated on 31 May 2021.

|-
! colspan=10 style=background:#dcdcdc; text-align:center|Goalkeepers

|-
! colspan=10 style=background:#dcdcdc; text-align:center|Defenders

|-
! colspan=10 style=background:#dcdcdc; text-align:center|Midfielders

|-
! colspan=10 style=background:#dcdcdc; text-align:center|Forwards

|-
! colspan=16 style=background:#dcdcdc; text-align:center| Players sent out on loan this season

|}

Goalscorers

Last Updated: 21 May 2021

Clean sheets

Last Updated: 31 May 2021

References

Al-Hazem F.C. seasons
Hazem